Leymus cinereus is a species of wild rye known by the common names basin wild rye, Great Basin wild rye, and Great Basin lyme grass.

It is a common native grass of western North America, including western Canada and the United States from California to Minnesota. It grows in many types of habitat, including grassland and prairie, forests, scrub, chaparral, and sagebrush.

Description
It has a large, fibrous root system and sometimes small rhizomes.

The inflorescence is an unbranched, cylindrical spike divided into up to 35 nodes with several flower spikelets per node.

This species may hybridize with Leymus triticoides, Leymus salina, and Elymus elymoides.

Habitat
The species can be found in moist, semi-alkaline flats. In salt flats, it is replaced by Distichlis stricta.

Uses
Native American groups had a variety of uses for the grass. The Okanagan and Colville used the roots medicinally to treat internal bleeding and gonorrhea and as a hair tonic. The Cheyenne burned the grass and mixed the ash with blood to make a black dye. Various groups used it for bedding, floor coverings, arrows, and basketry.

Cultivars used in rangelands or site reclamation include 'Magnar' and 'Trailhead'.

References

cinereus
Grasses of the United States
Grasses of Canada